The Commissioner is a 1998 internationally co-produced drama film directed by George Sluizer and written by Christina Kallas based on the novel of same name by Stanley Johnson. It was entered into the 48th Berlin International Film Festival.

Cast

References

External links

1998 films
1998 drama films
Belgian drama films
French drama films
German drama films
Films directed by George Sluizer
English-language Belgian films
English-language French films
English-language German films
Films about the European Union
1990s English-language films
1990s French films
1990s German films